Naches is a town in Yakima County, Washington, United States. The population was 1,084 at the 2020 census.

Economy
Naches' economy is based mainly on timber and agriculture, known for its large production of apples, cherries, pears and various other fruits.

Geography
Naches is located at  (46.729133, -120.699191).

Naches is located in the Naches Valley of the Naches River.

Climate
Naches has a semi-arid climate (Bsk) with hot summers coupled with cool nights and moderately cold winters.

Demographics

2010 census
As of the census of 2010, there were 795 people, 317 households, and 225 families living in the town. The racial makeup of the town was 92.8% White, 0.6% African American, 1.5% Native American, 3.3% from other races, and 1.8% from two or more races. Hispanic or Latino of any race were 8.3% of the population.

There were 317 households, of which 37.9% had children under the age of 18 living with them, 45.7% were married couples living together, 16.4% had a female householder with no husband present, 8.8% had a male householder with no wife present, and 29.0% were non-families. 23.7% of all households were made up of individuals, and 9.2% had someone living alone who was 65 years of age or older. The average household size was 2.51 and the average family size was 2.88.

The median age in the town was 37.4 years. 26.3% of residents were under the age of 18; 9.1% were between the ages of 18 and 24; 24.7% were from 25 to 44; 27.3% were from 45 to 64; and 12.6% were 65 years of age or older. The gender makeup of the town was 49.6% male and 50.4% female.

2000 census
As of the census of 2000, there were 643 people, 258 households, and 175 families living in the town. The population density was 1,595.8 people per square mile (620.7/km2). There were 279 housing units at an average density of 692.4 per square mile (269.3/km2). The racial makeup of the town was 86.94% White, 1.40% Native American, 0.16% Asian, 0.16% Pacific Islander, 6.69% from other races, and 4.67% from two or more races. Hispanic or Latino of any race were 10.89% of the population.

There were 258 households, out of which 32.6% had children under the age of 18 living with them, 53.5% were married couples living together, 12.4% had a female householder with no husband present, and 31.8% were non-families. 26.7% of all households were made up of individuals, and 11.2% had someone living alone who was 65 years of age or older. The average household size was 2.49 and the average family size was 3.04.

In the town, the age distribution of the population shows 26.6% under the age of 18, 10.0% from 18 to 24, 30.5% from 25 to 44, 20.8% from 45 to 64, and 12.1% who were 65 years of age or older. The median age was 34 years. For every 100 females, there were 102.2 males. For every 100 females age 18 and over, there were 86.6 males.

The median income for a household in the town was $42,083, and the median income for a family was $47,679. Males had a median income of $28,750 versus $22,961 for females. The per capita income for the town was $15,084. About 10.7% of families and 11.0% of the population were below the poverty line, including 13.8% of those under age 18 and 4.5% of those age 65 or over.

References

Further reading
 
 Developing interest in Naches Yakima Herald-Republic April 24, 2011

External links
 Upper Valley Bulletin Board
 Town of Naches
 History of Naches

Towns in Washington (state)
Towns in Yakima County, Washington